María José Martínez Sánchez was the defending champion but decided not to participate.
Alizé Cornet won the title defeating Yanina Wickmayer in the final, 7–5, 7–6(7–1)

Seeds

Draw

Finals

Top half

Bottom half

Qualifying

Seeds

Qualifiers

Draw

First qualifier

Second qualifier

Third qualifier

Fourth qualifier

References
 Main Draw
 Qualifying Draw

Gastein Ladies - Singles
2012 Singles
Gast
Gast